The Key (Swedish title Nyckeln) is the third and final part of Engelsfors, the young adult fantasy novel trilogy.

Plot
After the battle in the gymnasium hall, the Chosen Ones are not sure how to handle the death of Ida. Unbeknownst to them, Ida is trapped with Matilda in the Borderland between life and death. After Viktor begged Minoo to save his sister Clara, the leader of the council's Swedish division, Walter, has realised Minoo's potential as a valuable pawn. The Chosen Ones that are still alive have no chance to recover, and no choice but to rally together to try to prevent the apocalypse — even while their personal dramas threaten to tear them apart.

References

Swedish fantasy novels
2013 Swedish novels
Novels set in Sweden
Rabén & Sjögren books
Swedish-language novels
2013 fantasy novels